The Taylorstown Historic District comprises the historic core of Taylorstown, Virginia. The community and the historic district are centered on the Taylorstown Mill, a two-story stone structure on the banks of Catoctin Creek. Up the hill from the mill is Hunting Hill, a house built in 1737 for the mill's owner. The district also includes a store built in 1800, adjoined by the 1904 Mann's Store, with the 1900 Mann house across the street.

The town center was listed on the National Register of Historic Places on January 30, 1978. The district was expanded on May 26, 2005.

References

Historic districts in Loudoun County, Virginia
National Register of Historic Places in Loudoun County, Virginia
Historic districts on the National Register of Historic Places in Virginia